SS Cape Flattery (AK-5070) was laid down on 10 February 1972, as SS Delta Norte a Maritime Administration type (C9-S-81d) hull under Maritime Administration contract (MA 259) at Avondale Industries Corp., New Orleans, LA.  She was launched, 19 May 1973 and delivered to the Maritime Administration, 12 September 1973, for operation by Delta Line.  She was reacquired by the Maritime Administration for assignment to the ready reserve fleet (RRF), 14 May 1987 and berthed at Beaumont, TX as part of the Maritime Administration Ready Reserve Fleet.  When activated Cape Flattery is assigned to Military Sealift Command (MSC) as one of the Military Sealift Command's four LASH Ready Reserve Force Ships. Cape Flattery can be activated in 10 days

See also
  sister ship

References 
 SS Cape Flattery (AK-5070)

External links 
National Defense Reserve Fleet Inventory

 

Ships built in Bridge City, Louisiana
1973 ships